A county seat is an administrative center, seat of government, or capital city of a county or civil parish. The term is in use in Canada, China, Hungary, Romania, Taiwan, and the United States. The equivalent term shire town is used in the US state of Vermont and in some other English-speaking jurisdictions. County towns have a similar function in the Republic of Ireland and the United Kingdom, as well as historically in Jamaica.

Function

In most of the United States, counties are the political subdivisions of a state. The city, town, or populated place that houses county government is known as the seat of its respective county. Generally, the county legislature, county courthouse, sheriff's department headquarters, hall of records, jail and correctional facility are located in the county seat, though some functions (such as highway maintenance, which usually requires a large garage for vehicles, along with asphalt and salt storage facilities) may also be located or conducted in other parts of the county, especially if it is geographically large.

A county seat is usually, but not always, an incorporated municipality. The exceptions include the county seats of counties that have no incorporated municipalities within their borders, such as Arlington County, Virginia (where the county seat is the entire county). Ellicott City, the county seat of Howard County, Maryland, is the largest unincorporated county seat in the United States, followed by Towson, the county seat of Baltimore County, Maryland. Likewise, some county seats may not be incorporated in their own right, but are located within incorporated municipalities. For example, Cape May Court House, New Jersey, though unincorporated, is a section of Middle Township, an incorporated municipality.  In some of the colonial states, county seats include or formerly included "Court House" as part of their name, (e.g. Spotsylvania Courthouse, Virginia).

Canada

The provinces of Ontario, Quebec, New Brunswick, Prince Edward Island, and Nova Scotia have counties as an administrative division of government below the provincial level, and thus county seats.

In the provinces of Prince Edward Island, New Brunswick, and Nova Scotia the term "shire town" is used in place of county seat.

China

County seats in China are the administrative centers of the counties in the People's Republic of China.

Xian have existed since the Warring States period and were set up nationwide by the Qin dynasty. The number of counties in China proper gradually increased from dynasty to dynasty. As Qin Shi Huang reorganized the counties after his unification, there were about 1,000. Under the Eastern Han dynasty, the number of counties increased to above 1,000. About 1400 existed when the Sui dynasty abolished the commandery level (郡 jùn), which was the level just above counties, and demoted some commanderies to counties. 

In Imperial China, the county was a significant administrative unit because it marked the lowest level of the imperial bureaucratic structure; in other words, it was the lowest level that the government reached. Government below the county level was often undertaken through informal non-bureaucratic means, varying between dynasties. The head of a county was the magistrate, who oversaw both the day-to-day operations of the county as well as civil and criminal cases.

The current number of counties mostly resembled that of the later years of Qing Dynasty. Changes of location and names of counties in Chinese history have been a major field of research in Chinese historical geography, especially from the 1960s to the 1980s. There are 1,355 counties in Mainland China out of a total of 2,851 county-level divisions.

Taiwan 

In Taiwan, the first counties were first established in 1661 by the Kingdom of Tungning. The later ruler Qing empire inherited this type of administrative divisions. With the increase of Han Chinese population in Taiwan, the number of counties also grew by time. By the end of Qing era, there were 11 counties in Taiwan. Protestant missionaries in China first romanized the term as hien. When Taiwan became a Japanese colony in 1895, the hierarchy of divisions also incorporated into the Japanese system in the period when Taiwan was under Japanese rule. By September 1945, Taiwan was divided into 8 prefectures ( and ), which remained after the Republic of China took over. 

Currently there are 13 county seats in Taiwan, which are in the forms of county-administered city, urban township or rural township.

Lists of county seats

United States

In the United States, a county is an administrative or political subdivision of a state that consists of a geographic region with specific boundaries and usually some level of governmental authority.

U.S. counties with more than one county seat
Most counties have only one county seat.  However, some counties in Alabama, Arkansas, Georgia, Iowa, Kentucky, Massachusetts, Mississippi, Missouri, New Hampshire, New York, and Vermont have two or more county seats, usually located on opposite sides of the county. An example is Harrison County, Mississippi, which lists both Biloxi and Gulfport as county seats, and Hinds County, Mississippi, which lists both Raymond and the state capital of Jackson. The practice of multiple county seat towns dates from the days when travel was difficult.  There have been few efforts to eliminate the two-seat arrangement, since a county seat is a source of pride (and jobs) for the towns involved.

There are 36 counties with multiple county seats (no more than two each) in 11 states:
 Coffee County, Alabama
 St. Clair County, Alabama
 Arkansas County, Arkansas
 Carroll County, Arkansas
 Clay County, Arkansas
 Craighead County, Arkansas
 Franklin County, Arkansas
 Logan County, Arkansas
 Mississippi County, Arkansas
 Prairie County, Arkansas
 Sebastian County, Arkansas
 Yell County, Arkansas
 Columbia County, Georgia
 Lee County, Iowa
 Campbell County, Kentucky
 Kenton County, Kentucky
 Essex County, Massachusetts
 Middlesex County, Massachusetts
 Plymouth County, Massachusetts
 Bolivar County, Mississippi
 Carroll County, Mississippi
 Chickasaw County, Mississippi
 Harrison County, Mississippi
 Hinds County, Mississippi
 Jasper County, Mississippi
 Jones County, Mississippi
 Panola County, Mississippi
 Tallahatchie County, Mississippi
 Yalobusha County, Mississippi
 Jackson County, Missouri
 Hillsborough County, New Hampshire
 Seneca County, New York
 Bennington County, Vermont

Other variations

New England
In New England, counties have served mainly as dividing lines for the states' judicial systems.  Connecticut (since 1960) and Rhode Island have no county level of government and thus no county seats, and Massachusetts has dissolved many but not all of its county governments.  In Vermont, Massachusetts, and Maine county government consists only of a Superior Court and Sheriff (as an officer of the court), both located in a designated "shire town." Bennington County, Vermont has two shire towns; the court for "North Shire" is in the shire town Manchester, and the Sheriff for the county and court for "South Shire" are in the shire town Bennington.

Virginia
In Virginia, a county seat may be an independent city surrounded by, but not part of, the county of which it is the administrative center; for example, Fairfax City is both the county seat of Fairfax County and completely surrounded by Fairfax County, but the city is politically independent of the county. When the county seat is in the independent city, government offices such as the courthouse may be in the independent city under an agreement, such as in Albemarle, or may in be enclaves of the county surrounded by the independent city, such as in Fairfax. Others, such as Prince William, have the courthouse in an enclave surrounded by the independent city and have the county government, the Board of Supervisors, in a different part of the county, far from the county seat. The following counties have their county seat in an independent city:
Albemarle County (Charlottesville)
Alleghany County (Covington)
Augusta County (Staunton)
Fairfax County (Fairfax)
Frederick County (Winchester)
Greensville County (Emporia)
Henry County (Martinsville)
James City County (Williamsburg)
Prince William County (Manassas)
Roanoke County (Salem)
Rockbridge County (Lexington)
Rockingham County (Harrisonburg)
As well, Bedford was an independent city from 1968 to 2013, while also being the county seat of Bedford County. Bedford reverted to an incorporated town, and remains the county seat, though is now part of the county.

South Dakota
Two counties in South Dakota (Oglala Lakota and Todd) have their county seat and government services centered in a neighboring county.  Their county-level services are provided by Fall River County and Tripp County, respectively.

Louisiana
In Louisiana, which is divided into parishes rather than counties, county seats are referred to as parish seats.

Alaska
Alaska is divided into boroughs rather than counties; the county seat in these case is referred to as the "borough seat"; this includes six consolidated city-borough governments (one of which is styled as a "municipality"). The Unorganized Borough, Alaska, which covers 49% of the state's area, has no borough government or borough seat.

Lists of U.S. county seats by state
The state with the most counties is Texas, with 254, and the state with the fewest counties is Delaware, with 3.

See also
 Chef-lieu, administrative centres in Algeria, Belgium, France, Luxembourg, Switzerland, and Tunisia
 County seat war, disputes between towns in the formation of the United States 
 County town, administrative centres in the Republic of Ireland and the United Kingdom
 Municipality, equivalent to county in many countries

References

External links
 National Association of Counties

Seat